Clivinarchus perlongus is a species of beetle in the family Carabidae, the only species in the genus Clivinarchus.

References

Scaritinae